Steve Payne (born February 12, 1968) is an American college basketball coach. He currently is a Special Assistant to the Head Coach for the Cleveland State Vikings. Most recently he was the men's basketball coach at Tennessee Technological University in Cookeville, Tennessee, until his resignation following the conclusion of the 2018–2019 season. The Tennessee Tech Golden Eagles are members of the Ohio Valley Conference (OVC) and compete in the NCAA's Division I. Payne was appointed the head coach at Tennessee Tech on March 23, 2011, following the retirement of Mike Sutton. Payne had been an assistant to Sutton since the 2002–2003 season.

Head coaching record

References

External links
Tennessee Tech bio

1968 births
Living people
American men's basketball coaches
American men's basketball players
Basketball coaches from Kentucky
Basketball players from Kentucky
College men's basketball head coaches in the United States
College men's basketball players in the United States
Georgetown Tigers men's basketball coaches
High school basketball coaches in the United States
Junior college men's basketball coaches in the United States
Northwestern State Demons basketball coaches
Tennessee Tech Golden Eagles men's basketball coaches
Union College (Kentucky) alumni